This is an overview of the progression of the World track cycling record of the men's flying 200 m time trial  as recognised by the Union Cycliste Internationale.

Progression

Professionals (1955–1990)

Amateurs (1954–1990)

Open (from 1990)

References

Track cycling world record progressions